Alice Phoebe Lou (born 19 July 1993) is a Berlin-based South African singer-songwriter. She has released three EPs and four studio albums. In December 2017 her song "She" from the film Bombshell: The Hedy Lamarr Story was included on the Oscars shortlist for Best Original Song. Since 2019 she had also been active in her side project Strongboi.

She has released four studio albums to date — Orbit (2016), Paper Castles (2019), Glow (2021) and Child's Play (2021) — alongside two live albums and various singles.

Early life
Lou spent her childhood in Kommetjie on west coast of the Cape Peninsula in South Africa and attended a Waldorf school. Her parents are documentary filmmakers. She took piano and guitar lessons as a child. When she was 14 years old she was fond of trance music and started to take photographs from concerts, sometimes even getting paid for them. In 2010 she spent her summer holiday in Paris living first with her aunt but soon moved to live with a friend and started earning money by fire-dancing.

Career

Having a gap year after graduating from high school in South Africa in 2012 she returned to Europe, first to Amsterdam and then to Berlin. In Berlin she started to sing and play guitar as she found out that this was more lucrative than fire-dancing. After her gap year she contemplated attending university in South Africa, but eventually decided to purchase a battery powered amplifier and return to Berlin instead. In Berlin she performed on S- and U-Bahn stations and parks. After one month in Berlin, she played on a television programme. In April 2014 she self-released "Momentum" EP. The song "Fiery Heart, Fiery Mind" from the EP featured in the soundtrack of the 2015 released film "Ayanda". She also started to play in venues.

After a performance at TEDx in Berlin on 6 September 2014 she started to get offers from record labels, but she wanted to stay independent. In December 2014 she released a live album "Live at Grüner Salon" as means to fund the recording of her debut studio album.

In 2015 she started to tour and played first time at SXSW festival in USA in 2015. She has returned to SXSW every year after that. She also performed in TEDGlobal London in 2015 and opened for Rodriguez on his 2016 South Africa tour.

In April 2016 Alice Phoebe Lou released her album "Orbit", produced by Matteo Pavesi and Jian Kellett-Liew. She was nominated for best female artist at the 2016 German critics choice awards in Germany and was invited to several German TV programs for interviews and performances. She toured in Europe, South Africa and USA in 2016 and played three sold-out shows at the Berlin Planetarium. Moreover, she still continued busking in Berlin.

In December 2017 she self-released nine track "Sola" EP and a book titled "Songs, poems and memories". The same month it was announced that her song "She" from the film Bombshell: The Hedy Lamarr Story is on the shortlist for Academy Awards' Oscars in Best Original Song category. "She" was released as a digital single on 23 February 2018 with a music video directed by Natalia Bazina. In 2018 edition of the Berlin Music Video Awards, Lou's music video ''She'' was nominated for Best Song.
"She" also features significantly in two scenes of the German Film Kokon, which was released on 21 February 2020 (When 'Nora' and 'Romy' are on the roof of a building, listening to music; and at the end, as 'Nora' finds her Caterpillar has metamorphosed into its adult form).
During 2018 Alice Phoebe Lou toured Europe, USA, South Africa, Japan and Canada. 

The first single Something Holy from her Paper Castles album was released on 30 November 2018. On 15 January 2019, the second single, Skin Crawl, was released digitally. The video of Skin Crawl won in June third prize at the Berlin Music Video Awards in the best concept category. On 15 February third single, Galaxies, was released and on 8 March 2019 the album was released.

In March 2019 Alice was the artist of the month of Consequence of Sound. On 6 May Galaxies video filmed in Zeiss Planetarium in Berlin featuring Maisie Williams was released.

On 12 July A Place of My Own (Mahogany Sessions) EP containing four songs from Paper Castles album recorded live was released in digital format accompanied by a YouTube video of the recording session. On 7 August video for the Lost in LA was published. The song is from her Sola EP.

On 15 November Alice was interviewed in aspekte-program of German ZDF TV and she performed Paper Castles with her band.

In December Paper Castles album was listed at number 19 in the NBHAP magazine's 50 best albums of 2019 list and 7th in FMS magazine's top 35 albums and EPs of 2019 list.

During 2019 she had over one hundred concerts in Europe, Japan, USA and Canada. For example, she performed on 30 May 2019 first time at the main stage of Primavera Sound Festival in Barcelona. Later that day she had another smaller concert at the OCB Paper Sessions stage. On 28 February 2020 German TV Bayerischer Rundfunk broadcast and streamed her PULS-festival concert recorded on 30 November 2019 in Munich. In spite of extensive touring Lou still continued to occasionally perform in Berlin parks and U-Bahn stations too. In spring 2020 she had a short Europe tour and after that several streamed and broadcast concerts, for example on Arte.

On 13 March 2020, she released Witches single. Week before that, on 6 March, self-titled video Strongboi was released by her Strongboi side project with Ziv Yamin. The digital single of the song was released on 20 March. This was followed by Strongboi's Honey Thighs digital single on 10 April and Tuff Girl on 7 August. 

On 1 May she released ten track live album Live at Funkhaus from the December 2019 Funkhaus Berlin concert. Further, a short documentary filmed and directed by Julian Culverhouse about Paper Castles tour was published. On 26 June Touch single was released. A purple 7 inch vinyl containing Witches and Touch was released on 18 September. 

In November it was announced that her third studio album titled Glow would be released in March 2021. On 4 December single and video of Dusk from the coming Glow-album was released. On 10 December 2020, Alice covered Paul McCartney's  unreleased track Deep Deep Feeling for McCartney's ’12 Days of Paul’ campaign. On 19 February 2021, second single Dirty Mouth was released from the upcoming album with a music video. Glow was released on 19 March 2021.

On 2 December 2021 she released without any advance announcements ten track album Child's Play.

On 25 February 2022 while touring in west coast of USA, her side project Strongboi released new song Fool Around. She will continue touring through the summer and in autumn she will do a North America tour supporting Billy Bragg.

Discography

Studio albums

Extended plays

Live albums

Singles
 Something Holy (Single, 2018, 7 inch, instrumental version on B-side)
 Witches/Touch (Single, 2020, 7 inch vinyl and mp3/wav, double sided A single)

References

Further reading
NPR: Alice Phoebe Lou Dives Deep In The Ethereal 'She' Video
NBHAP: Young Independent Woman: Alice Phoebe Lou On Her Life As A Female Songwriter

External links

 
Official Youtube page

21st-century South African women singers
People from the City of Cape Town
South African expatriates in Germany
Feminist musicians
Indie pop musicians
South African singer-songwriters
1993 births
Living people